Déjà Vu Live is the sixteenth album by the rock band Crosby, Stills, Nash & Young, their sixth in the quartet configuration, and their third live album overall, released by Reprise Records in 2008. It peaked at #153 on the Billboard 200, recorded on their 2006 Freedom of Speech tour. The album was released on vinyl in early 2009 and was pressed on 200-gram vinyl in Japan.

Content
In 2006, Neil Young released his album critical of the Bush Administration, Living with War. Preparing to go on tour in support of the album, he invited his partners Crosby, Stills & Nash to put aside their own plans and join him. The resulting CSNY tour yielded both a film and this album, which serves as its soundtrack. All of Young's songs derive from the Living with War album, including three versions of the title track, while no Crosby, Stills, or Nash song dates later than 1971.

Track listing

Personnel
 David Crosby — vocals, rhythm guitar
 Stephen Stills — vocals, guitars, keyboards
 Graham Nash — vocals, rhythm guitar, piano
 Neil Young — vocals, guitars, piano
 Ben Keith — pedal steel guitar
 Spooner Oldham — keyboards
 Rick Rosas — bass
 Chad Cromwell — drums
 Tom Bray — trumpet

References

Crosby, Stills, Nash & Young live albums
2008 live albums
Reprise Records live albums
Albums produced by Larry Johnson (film producer)
Albums produced by Neil Young